This article is a list of people who led their own British dance band (distinct from British big band leaders, who played big band music). It includes those performers who were not British, but led a band based in Britain.

A 

 Harry Acres
 Bert Ambrose

B 

 Carl Barriteau
 Ivy Benson
 Harry Bidgood
 Stanley Black
 Josephine Bradley
 Teddy Brown

C 

 Billy Cotton

D 

 Joe Daniels
 Herman Darewski

E 

 Fred Elizalde
 George Elrick
 George Evans

F 

 Bert Firman
 John Firman
 Sid Firman
 Reginald Foresythe
 Roy Fox
 Ben Frankel

G 

 Freddy Gardner
 Geraldo
 Carroll Gibbons
 Nat Gonella
 Phil Green

H 

 Henry Hall (BBC Dance Orchestra)
 Fred Hartley
 Ted Heath
 Jack Hylton
 Mrs Jack Hylton
 Leslie "Jiver" Hutchinson

J 

 Jack Jackson
 Austen Croom-Johnson
 Ken "Snakehips" Johnson
 Archibald Joyce
 Teddy Joyce

K 

 Dave Kaye
 Ivor Kirchin
 Charlie Kunz
 Sydney Kyte

L 

 Brian Lawrance
 Harry Leader
 Jack Leon
 Louis Levy
 Sydney Lipton
 Joe Loss

M 

 Percival Mackey
 Ken Mackintosh
 Mantovani
 Billy Mayerl
 Felix Mendelssohn
 Sid Millward
 Gerry Moore
 Ivor Moreton

N 

 Ray Noble

P 

 Jack Payne
 Sid Phillips
 Lou Preager

R 

 Oscar Rabin
 Charles Remue
 John Reynders
 Hugo Rignold
 Edmundo Ros
 Harry Roy
 Charles "Buddy" Rogers
 Arthur Rosebery
 Val Rosing
 Syd Roy

S 

 Victor Silvester
 Debroy Somers
 Cyril Stapleton (BBC Show Band)
 Lew Stone

T 

 Al Tabor
 Nat Temple
 Billy Ternent
 Billy Thorburn
 Jay Wilbur

W 

 Frank Weir
 Jay Wilbur
 Jack Wilson
 Maurice Winnick
 Eric Winstone

Y 

 Peter Yorke

See also 

 The Savoy Havana Band
 The Savoy Orpheans

References

External links 

 The British Dance Band Enyclopaedia

British jazz bandleaders
English jazz musicians
English jazz bandleaders